A pregnatriene is a triene derivative of a pregnane.

An example is cortivazol.

References

See also
 Pregnane

Pregnanes
Polyenes